Oribi  Gorge is a canyon in southern KwaZulu-Natal, South Africa, 35 kilometres north-west of Port Shepstone, which itself is 120 km south of Durban. Oribi Gorge, cut by the Mzimkulwana River, is the eastern gorge of two gorges that cut through the Oribi Flats (flat sugarcane farmlands) of KwaZulu-Natal. The western gorge was formed by the Mzimkulu River.

In the gorge, the dense forest on the sandstone slopes is home to various small mammals, while the large leguaans excavate their burrows along the riverbanks.

At the base of the cliffs of both gorges the basement rocks are part of the Namaqua-Natal Metamorphic Province, which is over 1000 million years old. The cliffs themselves are formed by Msikaba formation sandstones deposited by fluvial environment about 365 million years ago.  Downstream from the gorges, a large surface mine producing cement from a limestone deposit. The road through Oribi Gorge was built by Italian prisoners of war.

Oribi Gorge derives its name from the oribi, a small antelope that lives in the gorges.

Oribi Gorge Nature Reserve 

It was proclaimed a protected state forest in 1950.

Animals 

In addition to the oribi and leguaans, vertebrates include bushbuck, duiker, reedbuck, vervet monkeys, Samango monkeys, various frogs and turtles.

References

External links 

 Ezemvelo KZN Wildlife (previously known as Natal Parks Board)
 Oribi Gorge Information Page
 360 degree Virtual Tour of Oribi Gorge

KwaZulu-Natal South Coast
Protected areas of KwaZulu-Natal
Canyons and gorges of South Africa